Danyor (Urdu:, Burushiski and ) is a city in the namesake sub-division in Gilgit District lies across the river Gilgit in the outskirts of the capital of Gilgit-Baltistan. It is known for its green fields, and poplar trees. The world's highest paved road KKH passes through its landscape.

Important places
The Shrine of Shah Sultan Ali Arif above the Danyore tunnel, the Chinese Graveyard near the Karakoram Highway and the rock inscriptions in the Chikas locality are the widely visited tourist attractions. Damaged Chinese Bridge of Danyor, The Danyor Suspension Bridge, which was constructed over a half-century ago, is quite a wonder; it connects the KIU Campus to the city. The Danyor end of the bridge enters a single-lane tunnel constructed by locals without any proper civil engineering equipment some five decades ago. The Danyor Springs under the broken Chinese Bridge is also widely visited by local tourists during summers.

Damaged Chinese Bridge of Danyor
One of the earliest and longest composite bridges in Gilgit-Baltistan was the Chinese Bridge over river Gilgit on Karakoram Highway that partly collapsed in 2009 as a result of corroded pillar foundation. Initially, two out of nine spans fell into the river, and later due to unstable structure, another pillar and third span were collapsed. The bridge is closed since then due to loss of connection and a new bridge is constructed near that is completed in April 2016. The bridge had two guard quarters at extremities each with patio and parapet and the parapets are decorated with qilins.

Health care
Danyor city has following healthcare facilities
 Aga Khan Health Centre
 Al-Hayaat Medical Centre
 Sehat Foundation Hospital

Places nearby
Gilgit City
Jalalabad
Nomal
Jutal
Bagrot

References 

Populated places in Gilgit District
Cities in Pakistan
Gilgit District